Nor Arabkir (also, Arabkir), is an upper middle class urban neighbourhood in Yerevan, the capital of Armenia. It is part of the Arabkir District of the city.

References 

Populated places in Yerevan